Chah or Cha is a village in Northwest Province of Cameroon that was abandoned after the Lake Nyos disaster of 1986, an eruption of carbon dioxide from nearby Lake Nyos that killed many of its inhabitants.

A recurrence of the eruption is believed to be possible, even likely, and there are additional concerns about the stability of the natural rock wall that holds back the lake water. However, the area is reported as being highly fertile, and  there are pressures to resettle the area, despite the great natural risks.

References

Former populated places in Cameroon
Northwest Region (Cameroon)
Populated places disestablished in 1986